Gian-Carlo Coppola (September 17, 1963 – May 26, 1986) was an American film producer and actor. He was the oldest child of set decorator/artist Eleanor Coppola (née Neil) and film director Francis Ford Coppola, and brother to screenwriter/producer Roman Coppola and director Sofia Coppola.

Early life
Coppola was born in Los Angeles, California, the son of set decorator/artist Eleanor Coppola (née Neil) and film director Francis Ford Coppola. As the eldest Coppola sibling, he was the older brother to Roman and Sofia.

Gian-Carlo was close friends with and was once dating Tracy Reiner, biological daughter of Penny Marshall and adoptive daughter of Rob Reiner.

Career
Gian-Carlo began his professional film-making career at the age of sixteen, working closely with his father. Like his brother and sister, Gian-Carlo—known to his family and friends as Gio—often featured in his father's movies as background characters (The Godfather, The Conversation, Apocalypse Now Redux and Rumble Fish), later acting as associate producer for Rumble Fish and The Outsiders, and second unit director on The Cotton Club.

In The Godfather, he appeared with his brother Roman as the two sons of Robert Duvall's Tom Hagen character, and they can be seen during the street fight and Vito Corleone's funeral right behind Duvall and Al Pacino.

During the pre-production phase of Gardens of Stone, Gian-Carlo was given the responsibility of filming the rehearsals and supervising the electronic cinema staff. There was also potential for Gian-Carlo to intern with director Steven Spielberg to work on the television series Amazing Stories before his passing. Director Penny Marshall had also hired him to work on the second unit for her feature film Jumpin' Jack Flash.

Death
Coppola was killed in a speedboating incident on Memorial Day, 1986, aged 22, in Annapolis, Maryland. Griffin O'Neal, who was piloting the boat, had attempted to pass between two slow-moving boats, unaware that the boats were connected by a towline. While O'Neal barely had time to duck, Coppola was struck and killed. At the time of the incident, O'Neal was being directed by Francis Ford Coppola in Gardens of Stone and was subsequently replaced. O'Neal was later charged with manslaughter. He ultimately pleaded guilty to the lesser charge of "negligent operation of a boat", was fined $200 and sentenced to 18 months' probation in 1987. He eventually received an 18-day jail sentence for not performing 400 hours of community service as ordered.

At the time of Coppola's death, his fiancée Jacqui de la Fontaine was two months pregnant with their only daughter, Gian-Carla "Gia" Coppola (born on January 1, 1987). Gia is a writer-director, having made the 2013 film Palo Alto.

Francis Ford Coppola subsequently dedicated 1988's Tucker: The Man and His Dream to his son. A scene in Francis Ford Coppola's 2011 film Twixt shows the death of a character as being similar to his son's death.

At the Inglenook winery, owned by Eleanor and Francis in Napa, California, there is a 12-acre vineyard called the "Gio vineyard", named after Gian-Carlo by the workers, which was planted in 1988.

Eleanor Coppola's touring art installation, Circle of Memory, commemorates the life of Gian-Carlo and has been exhibited in San Diego, Oakland, Santa Fe, Montpellier, Salzburg, Stockholm, and Oslo.

Selected filmography
The Godfather (1972) – Baptism Observer (uncredited)
The Conversation (1974) – Boy in Church (uncredited)
Apocalypse Now Redux (1979) – Gilles de Marais (Redux version only)
Rumble Fish (1983) – Cousin James (final film role)

References

External links

1964 births
1986 deaths
Accidental deaths in Maryland
American male film actors
Gian-Carlo
Male actors from Los Angeles
20th-century American male actors
Boating accident deaths
People of Campanian descent
People of Lucanian descent